The Lion and the Ram is an album by the American guitarist Larry Coryell that was released as by Arista Records in 1976.

Reception
At AllMusic, Wilson McCloy gave the album two stars and stated, "The Lion and the Ram is an underrated gem in the Coryell catalogue. It contains mostly acoustic guitar music and several outstanding original compositions. 'Bicentennial Head Fest', 'The Fifties', 'Domesticity', and 'Bach Lute Prelude' are fine examples of exciting, yet subtle and eclectic, improvisation-oriented guitar music."

Track listing
All compositions by Larry Coryell except where noted
 "Larry's Boogie" – 3:31
 "Stravinsky" – 3:17
 "Toy Soldiers" – 7:40
 "Short Time Around" (Larry Coryell, Julie Coryell) – 4:01
 "Improvisation on Bach Lute Prelude" – 2:00
 "Songs for My Friend's Children" (Mike Mandel) – 2:45
 "Bicentennial Head Fest" – 3:19
 "Domesticity" – 3:26
 "The Fifties" – 2:12
 "The Lion and the Ram" (Joe Beck, Larry Coryell, Julie Coryell) – 4:26

Personnel
 Larry Coryell – guitars, vocals
 Joe Beck – Fender Rhodes bass, string synthesizer, guitar
 Mike Mandel – piano, bass synthesizer
 Danny Toan – guitar on "Toy Soldiers"
 Michael Urbaniak – violin on "The Lion and the Ram"

References 

1977 albums
Larry Coryell albums
Arista Records albums